Hernando de los Llanos (active in the 16th century) was a Spanish painter active primarily around Cuenca for the duration of his career.  Little is known about his life or training, though he appears to have been familiar with the models of Leonardo da Vinci and Domenico Ghirlandaio.  He worked for a time in Valencia in collaboration with Fernando Yáñez de la Almedina.
Hernando los Llanos can be considered to be one of Leonardeschi, at the beginning of 16th century he and Yáñez traveled to Florence and collaborated with Leonardo for his The Battle of Anghiari fresco.
Collaboration was fruitful enough, while de los Llanos continued his artistic association on returning home to Spain.
He and Yáñez produced several copies after works of Leonardo da Vinci, including:
 Adoration of the Magi. Oil on panel, 194 x 227 cm, Cathedral of Valencia.
 Resurrection of Christ (includes elements from the Battle of Anghiari). Oil on panel, 194 x 227 cm, Cathedral of Valencia. 
 Christ carrying the Cross (includes elements from the Battle of Anghiari). Colección El Conventet, Barcelona.
 Workshop of Hernando de los Llanos. Christ carrying the Cross (includes elements from the Battle of Anghiari). Private collection. 
 Virgin and Child (Madonna with Yarnwinder). Museo de Bellas Artes, Murcia.

External links

16th-century Spanish painters
Spanish male painters
Pupils and followers of Leonardo da Vinci